Forever or 4ever may refer to:

Film and television

Films
 Forever (1921 film), an American silent film by George Fitzmaurice
 Forever (1978 film), an American made-for-television romantic drama
 Forever (1992 film), an American film starring Sean Young and Terrence Knox
 Forever (1994 film), a Filipino film starring Aga Muhlach and Mikee Cojuangco
 Forever (2003 film), an Italian film starring Giancarlo Giannini and Francesca Neri
 Forever, a 2005 Belgian comedy short, winner of a 2005 Joseph Plateau Award
 Forever, a 2008 Slovenian film by Damjan Kozole
 Forever (2015 film), an American film directed by Tatia Pilieva

Television

Series
 Forever (Philippine TV series), a 2013 drama series
 Forever (2014 TV series), an American fantasy crime drama series
 Forever (2018 TV series), an American comedy-drama streaming series

Episodes
 "Forever" (Buffy the Vampire Slayer), 2001
 "Forever" (CSI), 2003
 "Forever" (House), 2006
 "Forever" (Smallville), 2005
 "Forever" (Younger), 2019

Literature
 Forever... (novel), a 1975 novel by Judy Blume
 Forever, a 2002 novel by Jude Deveraux
 Forever, a 2003 novel by Pete Hamill
 Forever, a 2011 novel in the Wolves of Mercy Falls series by Maggie Stiefvater
 Forever, an imprint of Grand Central Publishing

Music
 Forever (group) or School Gyrls, an American girl group

Albums
 Forever (Aled Jones album) or the title song, 2011
 Forever (Alesso album), 2015
 Forever (Beautiful World album) or the title song, 1996
 Forever (Bobby Brown album) or the title song, 1997
 Forever (Code Orange album) or the title song, 2017
 Forever (Corea, Clarke & White album), 2011
 Forever (Cracker album) or the title song, 2002
 Forever (Cranes album), 1993
 Forever (Damage album) or the title song (see below), 1997
 Forever (Donell Jones album) or the title song, 2013
 Forever (Dune album) or the title song, 1997
 Forever (Flight Facilities album) or the title song, 2021
 Forever (GusGus album) or the title song, 2007
 Forever (John Conlee album) or the title song, 1979
 For Ever (Jungle album), 2018
 Forever (Kool & the Gang album) or the title song, 1986
 Forever (Medina album) or the title song (see below), 2012
 Forever (Mystery Skulls album) or the title song, 2014
 Forever (Ofra Haza album), 2008
 Forever (Orleans album) or the title song, 1979
 Forever (Phife Dawg album) or the title song, 2022
 Forever (Popcaan album), 2018
 Forever (Puff Daddy album) or the title song, 1999
 Forever... (Quo Vadis album), 1996
 Forever (Rex Smith album) or the title song, 1979
 Forever (R.K.M & Ken-Y album) or the title song, 2011
 Forever (S.H.E album), 2006
 Forever (Sleep ∞ Over album), 2011
 Forever (Spice Girls album), 2000
 Forever (Ute Lemper album), 2014
 Forever (Slim Whitman album), 1962
 Forever: An Anthology, by Judy Collins, 1997
 Forever: Rich Thugs, Book One, by Above the Law, 1999
 Forever: The Singles, by the Charlatans, or the title song (see below), 2006
 Forever... Greatest Hits, by Take That, 2002
 Forever, by Charly B, or the title song, 2012
 Forever, by Corea, Clarke & White, 2011
 Forever, by Don Diablo, TBA
 Forever!, by Hed PE, 2016
 Forever, by Hillsong Music Australia, 2003
 Forever, by Mad Heads XL, 2008
 Forever, by Pete Drake, or the title song, 1964
 4Ever (album), by Prince, 2016
 4 ever, by Dohzi-T, 2009
 4ever Blue, by Blue, 2005
 4Ever Hilary, by Hilary Duff, 2006
 Freezepop Forever, by Freezepop, 2000
 Scooter Forever, by Scooter, 2017

EPs
 Forever... The EP, by Lisa "Left-Eye" Lopes, or the title song (see below), 2009
 Forever, by Memory Garden, 1995
 Forever, by Number One Gun, or the title song, 2002

Songs
 "Forever" (Aespa song), 2021
 "Forever" (Alekseev song), representing Belarus at Eurovision 2018
 "Forever" (Beach Boys song), 1970
 "Forever" (Charli XCX song), 2020
 "Forever" (Chris Brown song), 2008
 "Forever" (Crystal Kay song), 2012
 "Forever" (Damage song), 1996
 "Forever" (Dee Dee song), 2001
 "Forever" (Drake, Kanye West, Lil Wayne, and Eminem song), 2009
 "Forever" (Haim song), 2012
 "Forever" (John Michael Montgomery song), 2008
 "Forever" (Justin Bieber song), 2020
 "Forever" (Kenny Loggins song), 1985
 "Forever" (Kid Rock song), 2001
 "Forever" (Kiss song), 1990
 "Forever" (The Little Dippers song), 1960
 "Forever" (Mariah Carey song), 1996
 "Forever" (Martin Garrix and Matisse & Sadko song), 2017
 "Forever" (Medina song), 2012
 "Forever" (Papa Roach song), 2007
 "Forever" (Roy Wood song), 1973
 "Forever" (Sandra song), 2001
 "Forever" (Sevendust song), 2010
 "Forever" (Six60 song), 2012
 "Forever" (Strawbs song), 1970
 "Forever" (Sturm und Drang song), 2007
 "Forever" (The Statler Brothers song), 1986
 "Forever" (Tina Cousins song), 1999
 "Forever" (Wolfgang Gartner and will.i.am song), 2011
 "Forever" (Ykiki Beat song), 2014
 "4Ever" (Lil' Mo song), 2003
 "4ever" (The Veronicas song), 2005
 "Forever", by 4 Strings, 2010
 "Forever", by Andy Grammer from Magazines or Novels, 2014
 "Forever", by As I Lay Dying from Frail Words Collapse, 2003
 "Forever", by Brand New Heavies from Brother Sister, 1994
 "Forever", by Breaking Benjamin from Saturate, 2002
 "Forever", by Brooke Valentine, 2012
 "Forever", by the Charlatans from Us and Us Only, 1999
 "Forever", by Chvrches from Love Is Dead, 2018
 "Forever", by the Cure from Faith, 1981 (2005 reissue)
 "Forever", by the Dandy Warhols from Why You So Crazy, 2019
 "Forever", by Dannic, 2015
 "Forever", by Dropkick Murphys from The Meanest of Times, 2007
 "Forever", by Edguy from Hellfire Club, 2004
 "Forever", by Eurythmics from Peace, 1999
 "Forever", by Exo from The War, 2017
 "Forever", by Faith Evans from Incomparable, 2014
 "Forever", by Fireflight from Unbreakable, 2008
 "Forever", by Fleetwood Mac from Mystery to Me, 1973
 "Forever", by Gesaffelstein from Hyperion, 2019
 "Forever", by Girls' Generation from Oh!, 2010
 "Forever", by Goldfrapp from Black Cherry, 2003
 "Forever", by Greg Sage from Sacrifice (For Love), 1991
 "Forever", by In This Moment from The Dream, 2008
 "Forever", by Into a Circle, 1987
 "Forever", by James Morrison from The Awakening, 2011
 "Forever", by Jennifer Lopez from Brave, 2007
 "Forever", by Joyner Lucas from 508-507-2209, 2017
 "Forever", by Juliana Hatfield from In Exile Deo, 2004
 "Forever", by Kamelot from Karma, 2001
 "Forever", by Kari Jobe from Majestic, 2014
 "Forever", by Keith Urban from The Speed of Now Part 1, 2020
 "Forever", by Lewis Capaldi from Divinely Uninspired to a Hellish Extent, 2019
 "Forever", by LFO from LFO, 1999
 "Forever", by Lil Baby from My Turn, 2020
 "Forever", by Lisa "Left-Eye" Lopes from Eye Legacy, 2009
 "Forever", by Live from Live at the Paradiso – Amsterdam, 2008
 "Forever", by Loop from Heaven's End, 1987
 "Forever", by Mario, 2015
 "Forever", by the Marvelettes from Playboy, 1962
 "Forever", by Mercy, 1969
 "Forever", by Michael W. Smith from Glory, 2011
 "Forever", by Michael W. Smith from Worship, 2001
 "Forever", by Mumford & Sons from Delta, 2018
 "Forever", by N-Trance from The Best of N-Trance 1992–2002, 2001
 "Forever", by P-Square from The Invasion, 2011
 "Forever", by Queen, a B-side from the single "Who Wants to Live Forever", 1986
 "Forever", by Red from Innocence & Instinct, 2009
 "Forever", by Roy Harper from Valentine, 1974
 "Forever", by Sam Cooke, 1957
 "Forever", by Slushii from Out of Light, 2017
 "Forever", by Snot from Strait Up, 2000
 "Forever", by Stratovarius from Episode, 1996
 "Forever", by Sugababes, a B-side of the single "New Year", 2000
 "Forever", by Jessica Sutta from I Say Yes, 2017
 "Forever", by Tanita Tikaram from Sentimental, 2005
 "Forever", by Todrick Hall from Forbidden, 2018
 "Forever", by Tory Lanez, 2019
 "Forever", by Vertical Horizon from Go, 2005
 "Forever", by Vince Neil from Exposed, 1993
 "Forever", by Wayne Horvitz from American Bandstand, 2000
 "Forever", by Will Young from Lexicon, 2019
 "Forever", by Y&T from Black Tiger, 1982
 "Forever... (Is a Long Time)", by Halsey from Manic, 2020
 "Forever (Keep Me Running)", by Scooter from Age of Love, 1997
 "4ever", by Black Eyed Peas from Masters of the Sun Vol. 1, 2018
 "4Ever", by Clairo, 2018
 "4ever", by Prince from Lotusflow3r, 2009

Other uses
 Forever Group, a media conglomerate in Myanmar (Burma)
 Forever (Mariah Carey fragrance), a perfume
 Forever (website), a social networking website
 Forever (For Old Lady Sally), a 2006 print by quilter Loretta Pettway Bennett
 Quarry Forever, the name of a slate quarry in Cilgerran, United Kingdom

See also
 
 
 Always and Forever (disambiguation)
 Endless (disambiguation)
 Eternity (disambiguation)
 Forever Young (disambiguation)
 Für immer (disambiguation)
 Permanent (disambiguation)